Burlington Northern Railroad Co. v. Woods, 480 U.S. 1 (1987), was a United States Supreme Court case that applied the precedent of Hanna v. Plumer to a conflict between state and federal procedural rules for a federal court sitting in diversity.

Opinion of the Court 
The defendant in the original case stayed a damage judgment and went on to lose on appeal. According to an Alabama statute, the defendant would be required to pay a ten percent penalty. Under Federal Rules of Appellate Procedure Rule 38, the penalty was discretionary. Holding the federal rule to be on point and constitutional, the court applied federal rule and gave no penalty.

References

External links
 

United States Supreme Court cases
Diversity jurisdiction case law
1987 in United States case law
Burlington Northern Railroad
Conflict of laws case law
United States Supreme Court cases of the Rehnquist Court